Petr Hořava may refer to:

Petr Hořava (theorist), Czech string theorist  
Petr Hořava (ice hockey), Czech ice hockey player